Propagandhi/F.Y.P is a 7" split between Propagandhi and F.Y.P, released in 1995.

Track listing
"Mate Like Porcupines" - F.Y.P
"Dinky Bossetti" - F.Y.P
"Glamourettes" - F.Y.P
"Letter of Resignation" - Propagandhi

Miscellanea
Though credited to Propagandhi, "Letter of Resignation" features only bassist John K. Samson on vocals and guitar. Samson later rerecorded the song with his band The Weakerthans on the album Fallow.

1995 EPs
Propagandhi albums
Split EPs